Salto do Itararé is a municipality in Paraná, Brazil.

Administration

 Mayor: Israel Domingos (2009/2012)
 Vice Mayor: Francisco Antonio Gomes
 President of camara: Antonio Adilson Gomes (2009/2010)

See also
List of municipalities in Paraná
States of Brazil

References

Municipalities in Paraná